The 1947–48 Detroit Red Wings season was the Red Wings' 22nd season.

Offseason

Regular season

Final standings

Record vs. opponents

Schedule and results

Playoffs

(2) Detroit Red Wings vs. (4) New York Rangers 

It looked initially to be a close series as, after the Blueshirts lost the first two games, the Rangers won the next two to tie the series. Detroit then took the next two to win the series in six games to qualify for the Finals.

Stanley Cup Finals

Player statistics

Regular season
Scoring

Goaltending

Playoffs
Scoring

Goaltending

Note: GP = Games played; G = Goals; A = Assists; Pts = Points; +/- = Plus-minus PIM = Penalty minutes; PPG = Power-play goals; SHG = Short-handed goals; GWG = Game-winning goals;
      MIN = Minutes played; W = Wins; L = Losses; T = Ties; GA = Goals against; GAA = Goals-against average;  SO = Shutouts;

Awards and records

Transactions

See also
1947–48 NHL season

References

External links
 

Detroit
Detroit
Detroit Red Wings seasons
2
Detroit Red Wings